HNLMS Zuiderkruis (A832) was a replenishment oiler operated by the Royal Netherlands Navy. Zuiderkruis entered service in 1975 and was decommissioned on 10 February 2012. Her design was based on the earlier replenishment ship . The ship has been stripped for parts and left Den Helder for scrapping in Turkey on 21 February 2014.

Service
On 15 October 1974 Zuiderkruis was launched at the yard of Verolme Shipyards in Alblasserdam and commissioned in the navy on 27 June 1975.

In 1981 Zuiderkruis was the first ship in the Dutch navy to have female sailors aboard.

The ships returned to Den Helder on 19 May 1982.

In 1988 Zuiderkruis and the frigates ,  and  made a trip to the far east and Australia to show the flag and for practice.

Zuiderkruis rescued 14 Sri Lankan refugees on 25 April 1996 Adriatic Sea and dropped them off at the Italian port of Bari.

On 17 February 2003 a combined Belgian-Dutch squadron left for practice on the Atlantic Ocean.
Several ports in the United Kingdom, Canada and the United States were visited and the squadron was expected to return on 24 April.

She,  and the school ship Urania visited Spithead for a fleet review held in honor of the 200th anniversary of the Battle of Trafalgar on 28 June 2005 .

References

Bibliography

External links

 Hr.Ms. Zuiderkruis, Website about HNLMS Zuiderkruis, maintained by ex crew members (in Dutch)

Auxiliary ships of the Royal Netherlands Navy
1974 ships